Kamenitza is one of the top-selling Bulgarian beer companies, alongside Heineken and Astika  based in the city of Haskovo. It was established in 1881 and is currently owned by the multinational Molson Coors. The brewery has a wide variety of lager and dark beers. Its slogan is "Mazhete znayat zashto" which translates to "Men know why."

Kamenitza had an 18% share of the Bulgarian beer market in 2005 according to data from ACNielsen. The company is a sponsor of the Bulgaria national football team.

Kamenitza currently has six brands: Light (4.4% ABV), Dark (6% ABV), non-alcoholic, wheat and Fresh (lemon- and grapefruit-flavoured, 2.1% ABV).

History

In 1881 three Swiss entrepreneurs built a brewery in Plovdiv on a hill called Kamenitza and used the name as their brand. The drink of choice for most Bulgarians at the time was lager, but Kamenitza broke new ground by producing the first dark beer for the market. By the 1890s they won awards at international exhibitions, including Brussels and Chicago.

The communist regime nationalised Kamenitza: first, in 1947, as part of the state-owned Alcoholic Beverages, then in 1952 as part of Vinprom.

The Belgian multinational company InBev bought the Bulgarian breweries Kamenitza, Astika and Burgasko Pivo in 1995 and added Plevensko Pivo in 1997. During 1997 to 2005, InBev invested 86.3 million leva in Bulgaria, and in 2005 Kamenitza sold 800,000 hectoliters, making it the best-selling domestic beer. 

In mid October 2009, private equity fund CVC Capital Partners bought all of Anheuser–Busch InBev's holdings in Central Europe for €2.23 billion. They renamed the operations StarBev.

Since the early 2010s, Kamenitza bottles have pull-off caps.

Gallery

References

External links
 kamenitza.bg – official website

Beer in Bulgaria
Economy of Plovdiv
Companies established in 1881
Molson Coors brands
Bulgarian brands
1881 establishments in the Ottoman Empire
Organizations based in Plovdiv